Abbas I's Kakhetian and Kartlian campaigns refers to the four campaigns Safavid king Abbas I led between 1614 and 1617, in his East Georgian vassal kingdoms of Kartli and Kakheti during the Ottoman–Safavid War (1603–18). The campaigns were initiated as a response to the shown disobedience and subsequently staged rebellion by Abbas' formerly most loyal Georgian ghulams, namely Luarsab II of Kartli and Teimuraz I of Kahketi (Tahmuras Khan). After the complete devastation of Tbilisi, the quelling of the uprising, the massacre of up to 100,000 Georgians, and the deportation of between 130,000 and 200,000 more to mainland Iran, Kakheti, and Kartli were temporarily brought back under the Iranian sway.

Background 
In 1606, Abbas had appointed Luarsab II and Teimuraz I (also known as Tahmuras Khan) on the thrones of Safavid vassals Kartli and Kakheti, at the behest of Kartlian nobles and Teimuraz's mother Ketevan; both seemed like malleable youths. However, tensions between Georgia and the Shah rose in 1612 as Teimuraz and Luarsab executed pro-Iranian nobility including the governor of Karabakh. In 1613, when the Shah summoned them to join him on a hunting expedition in Mazandaran, they did not appear as they feared that they would be either imprisoned or killed. In the spring of 1614 war broke out. This event brought an end to the Treaty of Nasuh Pasha.

Invasion 

Iranian armies invaded the two territories in March 1614, and the two allied kings subsequently sought refuge in the Ottoman vassal Imeretia. Abbas, as reported by the Safavid court historian Iskander Beg Munshi, was infuriated by what was perceived as the defection of two of his most trusted subjects and gholams. He deported 30,000 Kakhetian peasants to Iran and appointed a grandson of Alexander II of Imereti to the throne of Kartli, Jesse of Kakheti (also known as "Isā Khān"). Raised up at the court in Isfahan and a Muslim, he was perceived as fully loyal to the Shah.

Abbas threatened Imeretia with devastation if they did not give up the fugitive kings; the Imeretian, Mingrelian, and Gurian rulers jointly refused his demand. Luarsab, however, surrendered voluntarily to the Shah; Abbas initially treated him well but when he learned that Luarsab and Teimuraz had offered an alliance with the Ottomans he demanded that Luarsab accept Islam. When Luarsab refused, he was thrown in prison.

Teimuraz returned to eastern Georgia in 1615, taking advantage of a resurgence in Ottoman-Safavid hostilities, and there he defeated a Safavid force. However, when the Ottoman army postponed its invasion of the Safavids, Abbas was able to briefly send an army back to defeat Teimuraz, and redoubled his invasion after brokering a truce with the Ottomans. The Safavid soldiers met heavy resistance by the citizens of Tbilisi, but Iranian rule was fully restored over eastern Georgia.

Massacres and deportations

In a punitive expedition to Kakhetia, Abbas's army then killed perhaps 60-70,000 or 100,000 Georgians, with twice as many more being deported to Iran, removing about two-thirds of the Kakhetian population. More refugees were rounded up in 1617. In 1619 Abbas appointed the loyal Simon II (or Semayun Khan) as a puppet ruler of Kakheti, while placing a series of his own governors to rule over districts where the rebellious inhabitants were mostly located.

These deportations marked another stage in the Safavid policy of forcibly resettling huge amounts of Georgians and other ethnic Caucasian groups such as the Circassians and Armenians, to mainland Persia.

Aftermath 

Abbas obtained control over eastern Georgia for a time; however the aggrieved Giorgi Saakadze and King Teimuraz led new rebellions in 1625 and 1626 which were more effective at reducing Safavid control of the region.

See also 
Treaty of Nasuh Pasha 
Treaty of Serav
Bakhtrioni uprising

References

Sources

Further reading
 Ghafouri Ali History of the Iran's battles, from the Medes up to today 2009 .
 Asadollah Matoufi 4000 years history of Iran army, Persian title: Tārīkh-i chahār hazār sālah-i artish-i Īrān 2003 

1610s conflicts
Ottoman–Persian Wars
Battles involving the Kingdom of Kakheti
Battles involving the Kingdom of Kartli
Kingdom of Kakheti
Kingdom of Kartli
History of Tbilisi
Conflicts in 1614
Conflicts in 1615
Conflicts in 1616
Conflicts in 1617
Battles involving Safavid Iran
1610s in the Ottoman Empire
17th century in Georgia (country)